Agustín Jara (born 1 June 1992) is an Argentine footballer who plays for Santamarina.

Career
After spending time with the youth team of Colón de Santa Fe, Jara trialed with Major League Soccer side FC Dallas during their pre-season camp, eventually signing with them on May 16, 2016. He made his debut for the club on May 21, 2016, as an 88th minute substitute during a 4-2 victory over New England Revolution. The club waived him on August 15, 2016.

References

External links

1992 births
Living people
Argentine footballers
Argentine expatriate footballers
Association football defenders
FC Dallas players
The Strongest players
Club Atlético Colón footballers
Club y Biblioteca Ramón Santamarina footballers
Major League Soccer players
Bolivian Primera División players
Primera B Metropolitana players
Expatriate soccer players in the United States
Expatriate footballers in Bolivia
Argentine expatriate sportspeople in the United States
Argentine expatriate sportspeople in Bolivia
Sportspeople from Córdoba Province, Argentina